Sérgia Ribeiro da Silva, better known as Dadá (Belém de São Francisco, Brazil April 25, 1915 - Salvador, February 1994) was a Cangaço — the only woman to take up arms on the side of Lampião. There were two films made regarding Ribeiro,  Corisco & Dadá and A Mulher no Cangaço (1976).*

Dadá went on to live in Salvador, fighting to see the legislation that assures respect to the dead fulfilled - and the tetric exhibition of the Anthropological Museum Estácio de Lima, located in the building of the Legal Medical Institute Nina Rodrigues put an end.  It was only on February 6, 1969, under the Luiz Viana Filho administration, that the remains of the cangaceiros could be definitively inhumed - the museum having made molds to exhibit them instead.

References

Bibliography
 Luciana Savaget, Dadá, a mulher de Corisco Ed. DCL,  (in Portuguese)
 Roberta Bencini (February 2000). "A última peleja do Diabo Loiro" (in Portuguese)
 Antônio Amaury Corrêa de Araújo, Gente de Lampião: Dadá e Corisco

1915 births
1994 deaths
Brazilian feminists
Brazilian rebels
Women in 20th-century warfare
Women in war in South America
20th-century Brazilian women